Rajan Sawhney  (born May 2, 1971) is a Canadian politician who was elected in the 2019 Alberta general election to represent the electoral district of Calgary-North East in the 30th Alberta Legislature. She is a member of the United Conservative Party. On April 30, 2019, she was appointed to be the Minister of Community & Social Services in the Executive Council of Alberta. On July 8, 2021, she was shuffled into the Minister of Transportation.

On June 13, 2022, Sawhney resigned as the transportation minister and announced her candidacy in the 2022 United Conservative Party leadership election.

Minister of Community and Social Services

Privatization of 24-hour Government Direct Operations

Against the backdrop of the COVID-19 pandemic, on June 10, 2020, it was announced to families and care providers at these 24-hour Direct Operations programs—Residential Support Services (RSS) for  Persons with Developmental Disabilities (PDD) in Edmonton, Family Support for Children with Disabilities (FSCD) in Edmonton, and Graduated Supports Services (GSS) for PDD in Calgary—that CSS was exploring alternative service delivery models, transitioning from Government Direct Operations to Contracted Service Providers.  This included Scenic Bow Place, with its Scenic Bow group homes, included GSS assisted-living facility—a long-term residence for approximately 200 developmentally challenged residents, with a staff of 300 staff. According to a July 25, 2020 Calgary Herald article, PDD guardians and care givers attempted to submit a petition signed by 3,000 to Sawhney's Calgary office regarding privatization fears. According to a July 2020 CSS statement, the alternative service affects how services are delivered, not who will pay for them. The government will continue to pay for them but they will be contracted to "community-based organizations" that already provide 99% of residential and personal care services in Alberta. On July 17, 2020, CSS published a Request for Information (RFI) what is "currently available in the marketplace" as "alternative delivery model" for 24-hour Direct Operations programs in the Calgary and Edmonton regions, which could include "transitioning of residential and direct client services to contracted service providers". If all the facilities concerned are privatized, the government will save e C$3.48 million.

In 2019, the UCP government conducted several forums on public policies relevant to persons with developmental disabilities. The New Democratic Party had raised concerns about "underfunding, low staff pay and shortages of training and affordable housing."

Premier's Council on Charities and Civil Society 
In 2020, as the Minister of Community and Social Services, Sawhney established the Premier’s Council on Charities and Civil Society in partnership with then-Premier Jason Kenny. The Council consisted of individuals representing diverse regions and perspectives, and provided independent advice to government on its relationship with civil society organizations to help these organizations address pressing social issues across Alberta. In 2020, at the request of the Minister Sawhney, the council engaged with civil society organizations and experts regarding the impacts of the COVID-19 pandemic on civil society and produced a report, Moving Forward: Charting a Path to Civil Society Recovery. The council has also submitted annual reports for 2020-21 and 2021-22 that provide an overview of the Council, reports on its key activities and accomplishments, and outlines its outlook for the future.

In April 2021, Sawhney asked the Council to engage civil society organizations and relevant experts, and provide a report that includes advice on how civil society organizations can help address challenges facing women in Alberta in the wake of the COVID-19 pandemic. Based on the Minister’s direction, the Council conducted engagement with civil society organizations and experts, individual women with lived experience, and Elders from Indigenous communities and also undertook research on policy issues related to challenges confronting women. In 2022 the Council presented a report that offers advice on how civil society and government can work together to address challenges faced by women, particularly in the wake of the COVID-19 pandemic.

Assured Income for the Severely Handicapped

Sawhney was Minister of Community and Social Services (CSS) when the unpopular October 24, 2019  provincial budget decision to de-index the Assured Income for the Severely Handicapped (AISH) benefit from the Consumer Price Index, was announced. The UCP policy means that the maximum AISH rate for a single person will remain at C$1,685 per month and will not increase with the inflationary cost of living until at least 2023.  The budget decision reverts the 2018 Bill 26: An Act to Combat Poverty and Fight for Albertans with Disabilities, enacted by the previous provincial New Democratic Party government. The budget included both generous decrease in corporate tax rates and deep cuts to health and education program budgets as part of the UCP 2019 election campaign commitment to balance the budget by 2021. In the fall of 2020, Sawhney's AISH portfolio attracted media attention as AISH was again under consideration for further cuts. In response to a Postmedia report revealing that the CSS was reviewing AISH and potentially making cuts, On September 14, Sawhney dismissed concerns saying, "Let me state definitively that there will be no cuts to AISH financial benefits." On September 15, Premier Kenney said that the UCP was  examining "eligibility criteria" for AISH benefits in order to cut provincial government costs. AISH attracted media attention again in early October as AISH benefits cheques were late due to a banking technical problem.

Homelessness and the COVID-19 pandemic
The UCP government announced $25 million in March and another $48 million in early August to help community organizations that work on homelessness by providing shelters and support for homeless people during the COVID-19 pandemic. The CSS said in September that there was enough capacity for emergency shelters in Calgary. Canadian Alliance to End Homelessness's CEO, Tim Richter, told the Canadian Press, that normally winter emergency response planning is done in the summer. Concerns were raised that these plans had not been made by September, and the funding had not been allocated.

Sawhney told the CP that she was working with her counterpart in the UCP cabinet—Seniors and Housing Minister Josephine Pon—to address the "very dire need" for "permanent supportive housing in Alberta." In his response to Prime Minister Justin Trudeau's September 23, 2020 speech from the throne at the opening the 43rd Canadian Parliament, in which the federal government "focused on entirely eliminating chronic homelessness in Canada", Calgary mayor, Naheed Nenshi, said that the federal commitment to end homelessness could result in Calgary ending homelessness in two years, if the municipal, provincial, and federal governments work together.

COVID-19 Emergency Supports 
In March 2020, Alberta Government announced an additional emergency funding for charities, not-for-profits and civil society organizations to support their COVID-19 response.  In May 2020, Sawhney, as CSS Minister, after reviewing applications from across the province provided $30 million in funding to over 460 charities, not-for-profits, food banks and civil society organizations. Food banks across Alberta were provided $5 million in funding to help them feed vulnerable populations. Announcing the grants Minister Sawhney had stated that “Our daily routines and many things we take for granted have had to change, but together Albertans are meeting the challenges of the pandemic. Emergency social services funds are helping communities do more to support vulnerable Albertans.” Critical Workers Benefit, a one-time, $1,200 payment as an extra support to vulnerable communities affected by COVID was also provided in public healthcare, social services, and education sectors.

On December 15th 2020 Alberta government announced comprehensive outreach programs and supports to help residents living in communities with the highest rates of COVID-19, including upper and lower northeast Calgary. These communities faced unique barriers such as employment in public-facing and higher risk jobs, multi-family or multi- generational homes and large newcomer populations who faced language and cultural barriers. Some of the announced supports included: free hotel stay for 14 days for individuals who test positive for COVID-19, complete with culturally appropriate food; temporary financial aid in the amount of $625 upon completion of their self-isolation; COVID Care Teams to provide on the ground outreach and practical support, safe transportation to COVID-19 assessment and testing facilities; and public awareness campaign involving communication of key messages in more than 10 languages through radio television, print advertising, social media channels and web platforms. The Calgary Outreach and Calgary Covid Table was headed by Minister Sawhney. Sawhney and 17 not-for-profits worked to offer support for Northeast Calgary residents, which ranged from culturally appropriate food hampers and COVID-19 information in multiple languages, to mental-health and employment support. Care packages filled with hand sanitizer, masks and flyers with information in different languages were distributed across northeast Calgary within the first two days of announcements. The COVID care teams also packaged and delivered groceries, culturally appropriate food and necessities to doorsteps of NE residents needing support. A COVID hotline (1-833-217-6614) was set up to provide help and support for Northeast Calgarians in more than 25 languages.

To Increase the vaccination rates in Calgary NE area various walk-in clinics were opened. Many people in that part of the city are newcomers to Canada, working multiple jobs and facing language, financial and cultural barriers. Access to technology was another issue and all these obstacles made getting vaccinated much more of a challenge for them. These clinics were held at the Baitun Nur Mosque and Akram Jomaa Islamic Centre, at the Somali Canadian Society of Calgary and the Dashmesh Culture Centre. A northeast Calgary leisure centre’s (Village Square Leisure Centre) hockey arena was also transformed into a mass vaccination clinic for a weekend. These clinics operated on a no-appointment basis and were instrumental in bringing the vaccination rate in Calgary NE (the area with highest COVID infections) to 99%.

Disclosure to Protect Against Domestic Violence (Clare’s Law) Act 
On coming into office, Sawhney took action to address domestic violence in Alberta. She introduced the Disclosure to Protect Against Domestic Violence (Clare’s Law) Act in the October 2019 Legislature sitting, and the bill received royal assent in the same month.

Modelled after “Clare’s Law” in the United Kingdom, the Alberta legislation is named after a young woman killed by an ex-boyfriend with a history of violence against women. The Disclosure to Protect Against Domestic Violence (Clare’s Law) Act allows people at risk of domestic violence to find out if their partner has a violent or abusive past. The legislation also allows law enforcement to proactively inform an individual of their partner’s domestic violence history. The legislation came into effect in April 2021.

Minister of Transportation 
In June of 2021 Sawhney was appointed Minister of Transportation in a large cabinet shuffle. Sawhney held this position until she stepped down in June 2022 to run for the United Conservative Party leadership.

As Minister of Transportation, Sawhney oversaw a number of major construction projects. These included the opening of the remainder of the Southwest Calgary Ring Road to traffic on October 2, 2021; completion of Northeast Stoney Trail widening in July 2021; and the start of construction on the Springbank Off-Stream Reservoir (SR1) project in February 2022. SR1 is a 3,700 acre dry reservoir that, together with the Glenmore Reservoir, will protect Calgary and Southern Alberta from future major flooding events.

Traffic Safety Amendment Act 
In March 2022, Sawhney introduced the Traffic Safety Amendment Act, which was passed by the Alberta Legislature on March 30, 2022. The Act responds to calls from Albertans and sector workers for improved safety protections for roadside workers, including snowplow operators and highway maintenance workers. Sawhney also initiated a one-year pilot project which would allow tow trucks in Alberta to use blue flashing lights to increase roadside visibility and reduce near misses.

Photo Radar Policy Change 
In another safety-related initiative, the ministries of Justice and Transportation released changes to how photo radar is used by Albertan municipalities, responding to public sentiment that automated traffic enforcement was being used as a “cash cow.” ] On November 30, 2021, Sawhney stated that the “changes respond to public concerns requesting the elimination of ‘fishing holes’ or speed traps, while maintaining high levels of safety standards.”

Driving Back to Work Grant 
Based on 2019 data, it has been estimated that Alberta will experience a shortage of approximately 3,600 commercial truck drivers in 2023. To help address this potential shortfall, the Government of Alberta, through Transportation, introduced the Driving Back to Work Grant in November 2020 to provide financial support for Albertans to conduct Mandatory Entry Level Training. Budget 2022-23 provided additional funding for the Driving Back to Work Grant program.

Commercial Rest Stops 
Under Sawhney, Transportation also announced an initiative to lease public land for private development, with the goal of developing up to 18 commercial safety rest areas along major highways. In February 2022 she was quoted as saying that commercial truck drivers “deserve better amenities.” “Albertans, truckers and visitors do a lot of traveling on our highways, and they need safe places to pull over, rest and have a meal.”

Improving Rest Stops 
Working on the feedback from stakeholders from trucking industry and public complaints regarding the state of roadside washroom facilities Minister Sawhney approved $1.5 MM for the conversion 10 outhouse-style washrooms with pump-out pits on provincial highways to flush toilet facilities. Sawhney had stated that "motorists deserve to have safe, clean, modern and dignified washrooms as they travel our province’s highways. Converting 10 outhouse-style washrooms to flush toilets will benefit the travelling public, tourists and commercial drivers”

Highway Improvements 
In May 2022, as part of the Alberta recovery plan a new interchange at Queen Elizabeth II (QEII) Highway and 65 Avenue in Leduc was announced that would support more than 470 construction jobs and improve access to key cargo hubs. Sawhney quoted “The QEII is the busiest stretch of highway in Alberta and a critical economic and trade corridor. The Edmonton International Airport is growing as a significant cargo hub. This project supports hundreds of jobs while providing carriers, commuters and consumers safer and more efficient access to the area.”

In another announcement in May 2022 Minister Sawhney stated that the 72 year old Athabasca’s Highway 813 Bridge will be replaced by a new, $70-million structure. She quoted that “The existing bridge is old, too narrow and has served its useful life. The new bridge will support economic development, improvements to safety and commuter traffic in and around Athabasca, and provide a connection for area Indigenous communities.”

Sundre Wastewater Plant Project 
As Minister of Transportation, Rajan Sawhney oversaw a funding project to update the Sundre Wastewater Plant. $7.5 million was allocated to the town of Sundre to create a pilot project to test new technology and update the outdate wastewater infrastructure of the town of Sundre. The funding created a pilot project that would end in 2023 and create 69 construction jobs. Minister Sawhney was quoted as saying “Water is our most precious resource. Alberta’s government is pleased to support Sundre and other municipalities in their work to modernize core facilities, plan for future growth and meet the environmental standards of today and tomorrow.”

Highway 1 Wildlife Overpass Crossing 
In April 2022 Sawhney announced $17.5 million for the building of wildlife overpass crossing the Trans-Canada Highway in the Bow Valley area. Minister Sawhney stated that “This overpass will drastically reduce the chances of wildlife-vehicle collisions. The overpass will not only increase safety for the travelling public and wildlife, it will save thousands of dollars each year in property damage caused by collisions.”

Funding for Municipal Transit Systems 
Providing financial fuel for Alberta’s municipal transit system Minister Sawhney announced $79.5 million provincial funding, which after being matched by the federal government, provided a total of almost $159 million to support 26 Alberta municipalities. This funding was provided under a new program called Alberta Relief for Shortfalls for Transit Operators (RESTOR), as a top-up to assist municipalities that were feeling the financial pinch from low ridership over the last two years due to COVID. Minister Sawhney was quoted as saying “Public transit is an essential service, in particular for students who are returning to on-campus learning, seniors and other vulnerable populations who may be re-entering the workforce to get to and from work or re-engaging in social activities. Alberta’s government is proud to step up and recognizes how important transit services are to our communities.”

Red Deer Regional Airport 
In February 2022 Minister Sawhney announced $7.5 million grant to expand infrastructure and services at Red Deer Regional Airport.  Minister Sawhney was quoted as saying “The aviation sector is a vital part of Alberta’s Recovery Plan and this project will be a great boost to the Red Deer and central Alberta economy. This airport funding will attract more investment and new opportunities for residents and businesses.”

Western Transportation Advisory Council Fall Forum 
Minister Sawhney served as the Chair for the WESTAC (Western Transportation Advisory Council) Fall Forum in 2021. The theme of the forum was “A Legacy in the Making: The Impact of Critical Decisions on Canadian Prosperity.” This forum provided Sawhney with an opportunity to hear from select WESTAC members about issues facing the transportation sector and their businesses.

Minister of Trade, Immigration and Multiculturalism

Multiculturalism

Anti-racism Engagement Sessions, Grants and Alberta Anti-rascim Advisory Council and Alberta’s Anti-racism Action Plan. 
Sawhney’s ministry was tasked with standing up for communities in the province that face racism. The Ministry has set up multiple roundtables with marginalized groups to collect data and feedback on their experiences of racism in the province. Multiple roundtables have been held throughout the early months of 2023. The ministry has also set up grant programs to assist community groups to teach others about multicultural values and cross-cultural understanding. The Trade, Immigration and Multiculturalism ministry also oversees the Multiculturalism-Indigenous and Inclusion Grant. This grant is specifically to support cross-cultural understanding between Albertans and Indigenous, Metis and Inuit communities. Also within the multiculturalism portfolio of the ministry lays the Anti-racism Advisory Council (AARAC). Established in 2018 AARAC has 24 members from across the province that assist the Alberta Government in implementing the Alberta Anti-Racism Action Plan. This action plan is a multi-step plan aimed at addressing hate crimes and racism in Alberta. Created in July of 2022 this action plan is meant to demonstrate what the Alberta government is doing to address racism and ensuring all Albertans have equal access to information, resources, and services. There are five main themes within the Alberta Anti-Racism Action Plan that include Public Education and Awareness, Government as a Catalyst for Improvements, empowering Communities, Responding to hate Crimes and Data and Measurement.

Immigration 
Underneath the Immigration portfolio Rajan Sawhney has focused on increasing the amount of immigrants coming to Alberta. While the Canadian Federal Government is responsible for immigration matters, the provinces are awarded a certain amount of nominations to send to the federal government with priorities of some applications. 

On January 18th 2023 Rajan Sawhney announced a change to the Alberta Advantage Immigration Program (AAIP). AAIP is an economic immigration program that is aimed at bringing in newcomers to help fill large gaps in the Alberta labour force. While Alberta has yet to fill these gaps, hence their focus on strategic immigration. The change on January 18th was to prioritize immigrant applications who had close family connections in Alberta. Sawhney’s explanation of this change was that it will ensure immigrants coming to Alberta will have support systems to ensure they settle into their communities easier. The program will allocate 25% of the nominations given by the federal government to Alberta to immigrants with close family connections in the province.

Trade 
When Rajan Sawhney was installed as Minister of Trade, Immigration and Multiculturalism she was given clear direction about the Government of Alberta’s trade priorities. The mandate given to Sawhney was to work in collaboration with other ministries, towards enhancing Alberta’s trade infrastructure, trade agreements and trade corridors.

Committee on Internal Trade Annual Meeting 
In December 2022 Minister Sawhney represented Alberta in the Federal-Provincial-Territorial (FPT) Committee on Internal Trade Annual Meeting. Sawhney engaged with her fellow trade ministers and discussed working with them to achieve collective inter-provincial trade goals. This agenda of the meeting included closing years of negotiations to expand the Canadian Free Trade Agreement to include non-medical cannabis, and determine a path forward in the important financial services negotiations. At this meeting, Alberta offered a short presentation on the MacDonald-Laurier Institute’s Liberalizing Internal Trade Through Mutual Recognition paper.

Ottawa Trade Mission 
In December 2022 Minister Sawhney went on a Trade Mission to Ottawa and met Federal Ministers, MPs and High Commissioners of India and New Zealand to communicate Alberta’s priorities for Trade, Immigration and Multiculturalism.

Invest Alberta Corporation 
Under the Trade, Immigration and Multiculturalism portfolio sits a large crown corporation called the Invest Alberta Corporation. Created in 2019 the IAC works directly works with investors globally to start up or scale up in Alberta. The IAC has 11 international offices in areas with key markets of interest for Alberta. The IAC was created to offer seamless services for organizations looking to invest in the Alberta economy. Since Minister Sawhney has been Minister of Trade, Immigration and Multiculturalism the IAC has approved one grant to a business investing in Alberta.

Siwin Foods Ltd. Announcement 
On December 1st, 2022 the Alberta Government in partnership with the IAC and Siwin Foods announced a $54 million expansion to the Siwin Foods Edmonton facility. Siwin Foods is a food processing business that ships ready to eat food to international markets. Minister Sawhney approved a $2.8 million dollar grant through the Investment Growth Fund to help Siwin Foods scale-up their capacity to produce locally sourced food products. Rajan Sawhney was quoted as saying this about the announcement “Our government is proud to be creating an economic climate that is attracting and retaining high-impact investments to our province. We are continuing to work hard to ensure Alberta is known as an international destination to do business. Our recent investment into Siwin Foods will create jobs in Alberta, increase our economic growth and recovery, and support the Alberta agriculture industry.”

Leadership Race 
After Jason Kenny stepped down as leader of the United Conservative Party a leadership election was called. Rajan Sawhney stepped down from her role as Minister of Transportation to bid for leadership of the UCP. Sawhney’s leadership campaign platform included; Alberta energy and increased trade on Alberta energy, Public inquiry to Alberta’s response to the Covid-19 pandemic, addressing racism in Alberta, inflation relief payments, indexing AISH to inflation, indexing the tax system, indexing seniors benefits, indexing income brackets, strong relationship with healthcare workers, fairness for Alberta in the Canada confederation, and expanding diabetes supports. Sawhney was also a strong opponent to the Sovereignty Act, a platform item proposed by Daniel Smith another leadership candidate. Sawhney received 2.7% 2246 of the total votes cast (85,000 total votes cast) and was dropped on the second ballot.

Awards 
Rajan Sawhney has received the following awards.

Most Promising Newcomer Award- 2019: MLA Rookie of the Year 

Best Alberta Cabinet Minister-2022

Electoral history

References

United Conservative Party MLAs
Living people
Women MLAs in Alberta
Politicians from Calgary
Members of the Executive Council of Alberta
Canadian politicians of Indian descent
21st-century Canadian politicians
21st-century Canadian women politicians
Women government ministers of Canada
1971 births